Kitta (written: 橘田) is a Japanese surname. Notable people with the surname include:

 (born 1984), Japanese voice actress and singer
Mitsuhiro Kitta (born 1942), Japanese golfer
 (1934–2003), Japanese golfer

Japanese-language surnames